Ilamai Oonjal is a 2016 Indian Tamil-language action film written and directed by Mangai Harirajan. The film features Namitha in the lead role, while actresses Kiran Rathod, Meghna Naidu, Keerthi Chawla, Shivani Grover and Arthi play pivotal supporting roles. Featuring music composed by Karthik Bhoopathy Raja, production for the film began in mid-2012. The film had a delayed release on 3 September 2016 in India alongside the Kannada version Sikkapatte Ishtapatte.

Plot 
Some college students from Chennai go on vacation trip to a hill station. On their trip, girls get killed one by one in a thrilling manner. The rest of the story is why they got killed and who is the killer.

Cast 

Namitha as Durga
Kiran Rathod as herself
Meghna Naidu as herself
Keerthi Chawla as herself
Shivani Singh as herself
Aarthi as herself
Vijayakumar as Home Minister
Sumithra
Pandiarajan
Pandu
Anu Mohan
T. P. Gajendran
Bondamani
Sathyaprakash
Abhinayashree

Soundtrack

Production 
The film began production in September 2012, with Mangai Harirajan announcing that he would direct a film produced by Manoharan featuring Namitha in the leading role in an action avatar. Five more actresses including Kiran Rathod, Meghna Naidu and Keerthi Chawla joined the cast thereafter, with a photoshoot being held later in September 2012. Earlier the film was titled as Manmatha Rajakkal.

Namitha finished filming her scenes for the film in mid-2013, but the film was delayed after it could not find any distributors. The team subsequently released the film in a few screens during September 2016.

References

External links 

2016 films
Indian multilingual films
Films set in forests
2010s Tamil-language films
2010s Kannada-language films